Hydra is a genus of small freshwater organisms of the phylum Cnidaria and class Hydrozoa. They are native to the temperate and tropical regions. The genus was named by Linnaeus in 1758 after the Hydra, which was the many-headed beast defeated by Heracles, as when the animal had a part severed, it would regenerate much like the hydra’s heads. Biologists are especially interested in Hydra because of their regenerative ability; they do not appear to die of old age, or to age at all.

Morphology

Gland cells in the basal disc secrete a sticky fluid that accounts for its adhesive properties.

At the free end of the body is a mouth opening surrounded by one to twelve thin, mobile tentacles. Each tentacle, or cnida (plural: cnidae), is clothed with highly specialised stinging cells called cnidocytes. Cnidocytes contain specialized structures called nematocysts, which look like miniature light bulbs with a coiled thread inside. At the narrow outer edge of the cnidocyte is a short trigger hair called a cnidocil. Upon contact with prey, the contents of the nematocyst are explosively discharged, firing a dart-like thread containing neurotoxins into whatever triggered the release. This can paralyze the prey, especially if many hundreds of nematocysts are fired.

Hydra has two main body layers, which makes it "diploblastic". The layers are separated by mesoglea, a gel-like substance. The outer layer is the epidermis, and the inner layer is called the gastrodermis, because it lines the stomach. The cells making up these two body layers are relatively simple. Hydramacin is a bactericide recently discovered in Hydra; it protects the outer layer against infection. A single Hydra is composed of 50,000 to 100,000 cells which consist of three specific stem cell populations that will create many different cell types. These stem cells will continually renew themselves in the body column. Hydras have two significant structures on their body: the "head" and the "foot". When a Hydra is cut in half, each half will regenerate and form into a small Hydra; the "head" will regenerate a "foot" and the "foot" will regenerate a "head". If the Hydra is sliced into many segments then the middle slices will form both a "head" and a "foot".

Respiration and excretion occur by diffusion throughout the surface of the epidermis, while larger excreta are discharged through the mouth.

Nervous system
The nervous system of Hydra is a nerve net, which is structurally simple compared to more derived animal nervous systems. Hydra does not have a recognizable brain or true muscles. Nerve nets connect sensory photoreceptors and touch-sensitive nerve cells located in the body wall and tentacles.

The structure of the nerve net has two levels: 
level 1 – sensory cells or internal cells; and,
level 2 – interconnected ganglion cells synapsed to epithelial or motor cells.

Some have only two sheets of neurons.

Motion and locomotion

If Hydra are alarmed or attacked, the tentacles can be retracted to small buds, and the body column itself can be retracted to a small gelatinous sphere. Hydra generally react in the same way regardless of the direction of the stimulus, and this may be due to the simplicity of the nerve nets.

Hydra are generally sedentary or sessile, but do occasionally move quite readily, especially when hunting. They have two distinct methods for moving – 'looping' and 'somersaulting'. They do this by bending over and attaching themselves to the substrate with the mouth and tentacles and then relocate the foot, which provides the usual attachment, this process is called looping. In somersaulting, the body then bends over and makes a new place of attachment with the foot. By this process of "looping" or "somersaulting", a Hydra can move several inches (c. 100 mm) in a day. Hydra may also move by amoeboid motion of their bases or by detaching from the substrate and floating away in the current.

Reproduction and life cycle

When food is plentiful, many Hydra reproduce asexually by budding. The buds form from the body wall, grow into miniature adults and break away when mature.

When a hydra is well fed, a new bud can form every two days. When conditions are harsh, often before winter or in poor feeding conditions, sexual reproduction occurs in some Hydra. Swellings in the body wall develop into either ovaries or testes. The testes release free-swimming gametes into the water, and these can fertilize the egg in the ovary of another individual. The fertilized eggs secrete a tough outer coating, and, as the adult dies (due to starvation or cold), these resting eggs fall to the bottom of the lake or pond to await better conditions, whereupon they hatch into nymph Hydra. Some Hydra species, like Hydra circumcincta and Hydra viridissima, are hermaphrodites and may produce both testes and ovaries at the same time.

Many members of the Hydrozoa go through a body change from a polyp to an adult form called a medusa, which is usually the life stage where sexual reproduction occurs, but Hydra do not progress beyond the polyp phase.

Feeding

Hydra mainly feed on aquatic invertebrates such as Daphnia and Cyclops.

While feeding, Hydra extend their body to maximum length and then slowly extend their tentacles. Despite their simple construction, the tentacles of Hydra are extraordinarily extensible and can be four to five times the length of the body. Once fully extended, the tentacles are slowly maneuvered around waiting for contact with a suitable prey animal. Upon contact, nematocysts on the tentacle fire into the prey, and the tentacle itself coils around the prey. Within 30 seconds, most of the remaining tentacles will have already joined in the attack to subdue the struggling prey. Within two minutes, the tentacles will have surrounded the prey and moved it into the opened mouth aperture. Within ten minutes, the prey will have been engulfed within the body cavity, and digestion will have started. Hydra are able to stretch their body wall considerably in order to digest prey more than twice their size. After two or three days, the indigestible remains of the prey will be discharged through the mouth aperture via contractions.

The feeding behaviour of Hydra demonstrates the sophistication of what appears to be a simple nervous system.

Some species of Hydra exist in a mutual relationship with various types of unicellular algae. The algae are protected from predators by Hydra and, in return, photosynthetic products from the algae are beneficial as a food source to Hydra.

Measuring the feeding response

The feeding response in Hydra is induced by glutathione (specifically in the reduced state as GSH) released from damaged tissue of injured prey. There are several methods conventionally used for quantification of the feeding response. In some, the duration for which the mouth remains open is measured. Other methods rely on counting the number of Hydra among a small population showing the feeding response after addition of glutathione. Recently, an assay for measuring the feeding response in hydra has been developed. In this method, the linear two-dimensional distance between the tip of the tentacle and the mouth of hydra was shown to be a direct measure of the extent of the feeding response. This method has been validated using a starvation model, as starvation is known to cause enhancement of the Hydra feeding response.

Predators 
The species Hydra oligactis is preyed upon by the flatworm Microstomum lineare.

Tissue regeneration

Hydras undergo morphallaxis (tissue regeneration) when injured or severed. Typically, Hydras will reproduce by just budding off a whole new individual; the bud will occur around two-thirds of the way down the body axis. When a Hydra is cut in half, each half will regenerate and form into a small Hydra; the "head" will regenerate a "foot" and the "foot" will regenerate a "head". This regeneration occurs without cell division. If the Hydra is sliced into many segments, the middle slices will form both a "head" and a "foot". The polarity of the regeneration is explained by two pairs of positional value gradients. There is both a head and foot activation and inhibition gradient. The head activation and inhibition works in an opposite direction of the pair of foot gradients. The evidence for these gradients was shown in the early 1900s with grafting experiments. The inhibitors for both gradients have shown to be important to block the bud formation. The location that the bud will form is where the gradients are low for both the head and foot. Hydras are capable of regenerating from pieces of tissue from the body and additionally after tissue dissociation from reaggregates. This process takes place not only in the pieces of tissue excised from the body column, but also from re-aggregates of dissociated single cells. It was found that in these aggregates, cells initially distributed randomly undergo sorting and form two epithelial cell layers, in which the endodermal epithelial cells play more active roles in the process. Active mobility of these endodermal epithelial cells forms two layers in both the re-aggregate and the re-generating tip of the excised tissue. As these two layers are established, a patterning process takes place to form heads and feet.

Non-senescence
Daniel Martinez claimed in a 1998 article in Experimental Gerontology that Hydra are biologically immortal. This publication has been widely cited as evidence that Hydra do not senesce (do not age), and that they are proof of the existence of non-senescing organisms generally. In 2010, Preston Estep published (also in Experimental Gerontology) a letter to the editor arguing that the Martinez data refute the hypothesis that Hydra do not senesce.

The controversial unlimited lifespan of Hydra has attracted much attention from scientists. Research today appears to confirm Martinez' study. Hydra stem cells have a capacity for indefinite self-renewal. The transcription factor "forkhead box O" (FoxO) has been identified as a critical driver of the continuous self-renewal of Hydra. In experiments, a drastically reduced population growth resulted from FoxO down-regulation.

In bilaterally symmetrical organisms (Bilateria), the transcription factor FoxO affects stress response, lifespan, and increase in stem cells. If this transcription factor is knocked down in bilaterian model organisms, such as fruit flies and nematodes, their lifespan is significantly decreased. In experiments on H. vulgaris (a radially symmetrical member of phylum Cnidaria), when FoxO levels were decreased, there was a negative effect on many key features of the Hydra, but no death was observed, thus it is believed other factors may contribute to the apparent lack of aging in these creatures.

DNA repair

Hydra are capable of two types of DNA repair: nucleotide excision repair and base excision repair. These repair pathways facilitate DNA replication by removing DNA damages. The identification of these pathways in hydra was based, in part, on the presence in the hydra genome of genes homologous to genes in other genetically well studied species that have been demonstrated to play key roles in these DNA repair pathways.

Genomics
An ortholog comparison analysis done within the last decade demonstrated that Hydra share a minimum of 6,071 genes with humans. Hydra is becoming an increasingly better model system as more genetic approaches become 
available. Transgenic hydra have become attractive model organisms to study the evolution of immunity. A draft of the genome of Hydra magnipapillata was reported in 2010.

The genomes of cnidarians are usually less than 500 MB in size, as in the Hydra viridissima, which has a genome size of approximately 300 MB. In contrast, the genomes of brown hydras are approximately 1 GB in size. This is because the brown hydra genome is the result of an expansion event involving LINEs, a type of transposable elements, in particular, a single family of the CR1 class. This expansion is unique to this subgroup of the genus Hydra and is absent in the green hydra, which has a repeating landscape similar to other cnidarians. These genome characteristics make Hydra attractive for studies of transposon-driven speciations and genome expansions.

See also 

 Lernaean Hydra, a Greek mythological aquatic creature after which the genus is named
 Turritopsis dohrnii, another cnidarian (a jellyfish) that scientists believe to be immortal

References 

Hydridae
Negligibly senescent organisms